Obóz Zjednoczenia Narodowego (abbreviated "OZN"; and often called "Ozon" (Polish for "ozone")) was a Polish political party founded in 1937 by sections of the leadership in the Sanacja movement.

A year after the 1935 death of Poland's Chief of State Marshal Józef Piłsudski, in mid-1936, one of his followers, Marshal Edward Rydz-Śmigły, attempted to unite the various  government factions under his leadership. The attempt failed as another (opposing) Sanacja politician, President Ignacy Mościcki, likewise had a large following;  nevertheless, substantial numbers of people did throw their lot in with Rydz-Śmigły.

On February 21, 1937, diplomat and Colonel Adam Koc formally announced the formation of OZN. Its stated aims were to improve Poland's national defense and to safeguard the April 1935 Constitution. OZN was strongly pro-military, and its politicians sought to portray Marshal Rydz-Śmigły as Marshal Józef Piłsudski's heir, describing Rydz-Śmigły as the "second person in the country" after President Mościcki—a claim that had no foundation in the Polish Constitution. The party later went on to win the 1938 Legislative election.

The OZN adopted 13 theses on the Jewish question. Modeled after the Nuremberg laws, they labelled Jews as a foreign element that should be deprived of all civil rights and ultimately expelled altogether.

OZN'''s first official leader was Adam Koc, and its second was General Stanisław Skwarczyński. After the 1939 German invasion of Poland and the start of World War II, OZN leadership passed to Colonel Zygmunt Wenda. In 1937, OZN claimed some 40,000–50,000 members; in 1938, 100,000.

During World War II and the German occupation of Poland, OZN's underground military arm, created in 1942, was known as Obóz Polski Walczącej (the Camp of Fighting Poland).

See also
 Nonpartisan Bloc for Cooperation with the Government (Bezpartyjny Blok Współpracy z Rządem,  BBWR)
 National Radical Camp (1934) (Obóz Narodowo-Radykalny, ONR'')

References

Bibliography
 
 

Political parties established in 1937
1937 establishments in Poland
Defunct political parties in Poland
Nationalist parties in Poland
Antisemitism in Europe
Antisemitism in Poland
Polish nationalism
Polish nationalist parties
Right-wing antisemitism
Political parties disestablished in 1940
1940 disestablishments in Poland